The Congolese Football Federation is the governing body of football in the Republic of Congo. It was founded in 1962, affiliated to FIFA in 1964 and to CAF in 1966. It organizes the national football league and the national team.

References

External links

Congo at the FIFA website.
Congo at the CAF website.

Congo
Football in the Republic of the Congo
Sports organizations established in 1962
Sports organisations of the Republic of the Congo
1962 establishments in the Republic of the Congo